is a Japanese racing cyclist, who most recently rode for UCI Women's Continental Team .

Career
Born in Maebashi, Hagiwara graduated from the National Institute of Fitness and Sports in Kanoya and joined the cycling team sponsored by the Japanese bicycle store Cycle Base Asahi. She won the Japanese National Road Race Championships three years in a row between 2010 and 2012 and the Japanese National Time Trial Championships five times in a row between 2008 and 2012. She represented Japan in cycling at the 2012 Summer Olympics in the women's individual road race. In November 2012, it was announced that Hagiwara had signed to ride with the British cycling team  for the 2013 season. She lost her national road race and time trial crowns to Eri Yonamine in 2013, but won both titles again in 2014. In 2015, she lost the time trial title to Yonamine, but was again crowned road race champion. That year also saw her become the first Japanese to win a stage in a grand tour, as she took victory in stage 6 of the Giro d'Italia Femminile.

Major results

2004
 Asian Junior Road Championships
1st  Road race
1st  Time trial
2005
 2nd  Points race, Asian Track Championships
 2nd Time trial, National Road Championships
2006
 1st  Road race, Asian Games
 2nd Road race, National Road Championships
 World University Cycling Championship
9th Road race
10th Time trial
2008
 National Road Championships
1st  Time trial
3rd Road race
 3rd  Time trial, Asian Road Championships
2009
 1st  Time trial, National Road Championships
 4th Road race, East Asian Games
2010
 1st  Points race, Asian Track Championships
 National Road Championships
1st  Road race
1st  Time trial
 2nd  Time trial, Asian Road Championships
2011
 National Road Championships
1st  Road race
1st  Time trial
 6th Overall Tour de Bretagne Féminin
2012
 National Road Championships
1st  Road race
1st  Time trial
 2nd Overall Tour of Thailand
2013
 1st Championnat de Wallonie
 National Road Championships
2nd Time trial
3rd Road race
2014
 National Road Championships
1st  Road race
1st  Time trial
 1st  Asian rider classification Tour of Zhoushan Island
2015
 National Road Championships
1st  Road race
2nd Time trial
 1st Stage 6 Giro d'Italia Femminile
 Asian Road Championships
2nd  Time trial
10th Road race
 3rd Gooik–Geraardsbergen–Gooik
 3rd Grand Prix de Plumelec-Morbihan Dames
 5th Overall Tour de Bretagne Féminin
1st Stage 3
2016
 Asian Road Championships
1st  Time trial
3rd  Road race
 National Road Championships
2nd Road race
3rd Time trial
2017
 3rd Cadel Evans Great Ocean Road Race

References

External links
 
 

1986 births
Living people
Japanese female cyclists
People from Maebashi
Cyclists at the 2012 Summer Olympics
Olympic cyclists of Japan
Asian Games medalists in cycling
Cyclists at the 2006 Asian Games
Cyclists at the 2010 Asian Games
Asian Games gold medalists for Japan
Medalists at the 2006 Asian Games